Upper Yemen and Lower Yemen are traditional regions of the north western highland mountains of Yemen. Northern Highlands and Southern Highlands are terms more commonly used presently.  The Sumara Mountains just south of the town of Yarim denote the boundaries of the two regions. These two traditional regions also coincide with Gourchenour and Obermeyer's ecological zones. Upper Yemen is home to practitioners of the Zaidi sect of Islam and inhabitants of the region are sometimes referred to by that name.  Major urban centers include Dhamar, Hajjah, and the Yemeni capital of Sanaa.

Geography of Yemen